The North Coast Brewing Company is a craft brewery located in Fort Bragg, California. As of 2018, it is the -largest craft brewer by annual sales volume in the United States.

History 
The North Coast Brewing Company was founded in 1988 as a brewpub by Mark Ruedrich, Tom Allen and Doug Moody, producing 400 barrels of beer its first year. In 1996, they acquired the rights to the Acme Brewing Company brand, originally founded in San Francisco in 1907.

Beers

Current 
North Coast Brewing Company currently produces 13 beers year-round as well as 4 seasonal beers that are produced quarterly.

Year-round 

 Blue Star - unfiltered American wheat beer
 Brother Thelonious - Belgian-style strong dark ale, in honor of Thelonious Monk and some profits are donated to the education programs at the Monterey Jazz Festival
 Foggy Day IPA - Hazy IPA
 Laguna Baja - Vienna dark lager
 Le Merle - saison
 North Coast Steller IPA - India pale ale
 Old No. 38 - Dublin dry stout
 Old Rasputin - Russian imperial stout
 Old Stock Ale - Old ale, also bottled in limited reserve vintages and barrel-aged, including one to benefit 
 Pacific Magic IPA - IPA
 PranQster - Belgian-style golden ale
 Red Seal - American amber ale
 Scrimshaw - pilsner

Barrel-aged 
 Barrel Aged Old Rasputin XXIV - Russian imperial stout, aged in bourbon whiskey barrels
 Barrel Aged Old Rasputin XXIII - Russian imperial stout, aged in bourbon whiskey barrels
 Barrel Aged Old Rasputin XXIII - Russian imperial stout, aged in rye whiskey barrels
 Barrel Aged Old Rasputin XXII - Russian imperial stout, aged in bourbon whiskey barrels
 Barrel Aged Old Rasputin XXII - Russian imperial stout, aged in rye whiskey barrels
 Barrel Aged Old Rasputin XXI - Russian imperial stout, aged in bourbon whiskey barrels

Limited reserve 
 Anniversary XX - agave nectar pale ale, released in celebration of the brewery's Twentieth anniversary

Retired 
 Acme California Brown - Brown ale
 Acme IPA - California India pale ale
 Beer Engine Red - Irish red ale
 Black Hart - a dry Irish-style stout
 Class of '88 - a barley wine produced in collaboration with Rogue Ales and distributed via Deschutes Brewery's channels
 Cru D'or - Dubbel
 Grand Cru - brewed with agave nectar and aged in used bourbon barrels
 Mary's Pilsner - Pilsner
 Puck the Beer" - Petite Saison
 Wintertime Ale'' - Christmas beer

Awards

See also 
 California breweries
 Beer in the United States
 Barrel-aged beer

References

External links 
 

Beer brewing companies based in Mendocino County, California
American companies established in 1988
Food and drink companies established in 1988
1988 establishments in California
Benefit corporations
Certified B Corporations in the Food & Beverage Industry